The Brunei Methanol Company (BMC) is a methanol plant in Sungai Liang, Brunei. According to the Brunei Darussalam Newsletter, the BMC plant was the largest investment done outside of the oil and gas and LNG industry. The plant was noted to have the capability to produce up to 850,000 tonnes of methanol per year. The project was part of the Wawasan Brunei 2035 goals on diversing Brunei's economy and reduce the dependence on oil and gas industry.

History 
The first proposal for the project was accepted in August 2004, and the Joint Venture (JV) Agreement was signed between the Mitsubishi Gas Chemical Company, PetroleumBRUNEI and Itochu Corporation. The company was officially established on March 13, 2006. On 30 November 2007, the groundbreaking for the methanol plant project begun, and with the construction starting within the Sungai Liang Industrial Park (SPARK) in February 2008. Notably during the cornerstone ceremony, it was carried out by the Crown Prince Al-Muhtadee Billah.

The USD$600 million 16-hectare plant was officially opened by Sultan Hassanal Bolkiah on May 25, 2010. During the second half of 2011, it has only been running on 80% due to several emergency shutdowns. In 2013, the Government of Brunei showed concerns over an unknown dark and possibly harmful fumes coming out of the plant.

On March 22, 2021, Universiti Brunei Darussalam (UBD) staffs visited the BMC's plant in search for possible research collaborations. During the COVID-19 pandemic in Brunei in December of that same year, BMC has donated medical supplies to the Ministry of Health (MoH).

Shareholders 
The operating company—Brunei Methanol Company Sdn Bhd—is owned by the Mitsubishi Gas Chemical Company (50%), PetroleumBRUNEI (25%) and Itochu Corporation (25%).

References

External links

 Corporate website

Oil and gas companies of Brunei
Energy infrastructure in Brunei
Non-renewable resource companies established in 1969
2006 establishments in Brunei
Belait District